The Firth of Forth is the estuary, or firth, of several Scottish rivers including the River Forth. It meets the North Sea with Fife on the north coast and Lothian on the south.

Name
Firth is a cognate of fjord, a Norse word meaning a narrow inlet.
 
Forth stems from the name of the river; this is *Vo-rit-ia (slow running) in Proto-Celtic, yielding Foirthe in Old Gaelic and Gweryd in Welsh.

It was known as Bodotria in Roman times. In the Norse sagas it was known as the Myrkvifiörd. An early Welsh name is Merin Iodeo, or the "Sea of Iudeu".

Geography and economy
Geologically, the Firth of Forth is a fjord, formed by the Forth Glacier in the last glacial period. The drainage basin for the Firth of Forth covers a wide geographic area including places as far from the shore as Ben Lomond, Cumbernauld, Harthill, Penicuik and the edges of Gleneagles Golf Course.

Many towns line the shores, as well as the petrochemical complexes at Grangemouth, commercial docks at Leith, former oil rig construction yards at Methil, the ship breaking facility at Inverkeithing and the former naval dockyard at Rosyth, along with numerous other industrial areas, including the Forth Bridgehead area, encompassing Rosyth, Inverkeithing and the southern edge of Dunfermline, Burntisland, Kirkcaldy, Bo'ness and Leven.

The firth is bridged in two places. The Kincardine Bridge and the Clackmannanshire Bridge cross it at Kincardine, while further east the Forth Bridge, the Forth Road Bridge and the Queensferry Crossing cross from North Queensferry to South Queensferry. The Romans reportedly made a bridge of around 900 boats, probably at South Queensferry.

From 1964 to 1982, a tunnel existed under the Firth of Forth, dug by coal miners to link the Kinneil colliery on the south side of the Forth with the Valleyfield colliery on the north side. This is shown in the 1968 educational film Forth – Powerhouse for Industry. The shafts leading into the tunnel were filled and capped with concrete when the tunnel was closed, and it is believed to have filled with water or collapsed in places.

In July 2007, a hovercraft passenger service completed a two-week trial between Portobello, Edinburgh and Kirkcaldy, Fife. The trial of the service (marketed as "Forthfast") was hailed as a major operational success, with an average passenger load of 85 percent. It was estimated the service would decrease congestion for commuters on the Forth road and rail bridges by carrying about 870,000 passengers each year. Despite its initial success, the project was cancelled in December, 2011.

The inner firth, located between the Kincardine and Forth bridges, has lost about half of its former intertidal area as a result of land reclamation, partly for agriculture, but mainly for industry and the large ash lagoons built to deposit spoil from the coal-fired Longannet Power Station near Kincardine. Historic villages line the Fife shoreline; Limekilns, Charlestown and Culross, established in the 6th century, where Saint Kentigern was born.

The firth is important for nature conservation and is a Site of Special Scientific Interest. The Firth of Forth Islands SPA (Special Protection Area) is home to more than 90,000 breeding seabirds every year. There is a bird observatory on the Isle of May. A series of sand and gravel banks in the approaches to the firth have since 2014 been designated as a Nature Conservation Marine Protected Area under the name Firth of Forth Banks Complex.

The youngest person to swim across the Firth of Forth was 13-year-old Joseph Feeney, who accomplished the feat in 1933.

In 2008, a controversial bid to allow oil transfer between ships in the firth was refused by Forth Ports. SPT Marine Services had asked permission to transfer 7.8 million tonnes of crude oil per year between tankers, but the proposals were met with determined opposition from conservation groups.

Islands

Bass Rock
Craigleith
Cramond
Eyebroughy
Fidra
Inchcolm
Inchgarvie
Inchkeith
Inchmickery with Cow and Calf
Lamb
Isle of May

Shoreline settlements
 Lowest bridging point: Stirling

North shore

Aberdour, Anstruther
Buckhaven, Burntisland
Cellardyke, Crail
Culross
Charlestown, Limekilns
Dalgety Bay, Dysart
Earlsferry, East Wemyss, Elie
Inverkeithing
Kincardine, Kinghorn, Kirkcaldy
Leven, Lower Largo
Methil
North Queensferry
Pittenweem
Rosyth
St Monans
West Wemyss

South shore

Aberlady
Blackness, Bo'ness
Cockenzie, Cramond
Dirleton, Dunbar, Dunglass
Edinburgh
Fisherrow
Grangemouth, Granton, Gullane
Inveresk
Leith, Longniddry
Musselburgh
Newhaven, North Berwick
Port Edgar, Portobello, Port Seton
Prestonpans
Seafield, South Queensferry
Whitekirk

Places of interest

Aberlady Bay, Archerfield Links
Barns Ness Lighthouse, Bass Rock and St Baldred's chapel, Belhaven, Blackness Castle
Caves of Caiplie, Cockenzie Power Station, Culross
Dalmeny House, Dirleton Castle
Gullane Bents
Hopetoun House, Hopetoun Monument
John Muir Country Park, John Muir Way
Longniddry Bents
Musselburgh Racecourse
North Berwick Golf Club, North Berwick Law
Prestongrange Industrial Heritage Museum, Preston Tower, East Lothian
Ravenscraig Castle, Royal Racing Yacht Bloodhound, Royal Yacht Britannia
Scottish Fisheries Museum, Scottish Seabird Centre, Seton Sands, St. Fillan's Cave, St. Monans Windmill
Tantallon Castle, Torness Nuclear Power Station
Waterston House
Yellowcraigs

References

External links

Isle of May bird observatory
Forthfast experimental hovercraft service, 16–28 July 2007
Inchcolm Virtual Tour Take a virtual tour around some of the Inchcolm's military defences

 
Estuaries of Scotland
Landforms of Fife
Forth
Ramsar sites in Scotland
Sites of Special Scientific Interest in Dunfermline and Kirkcaldy
Sites of Special Scientific Interest in Edinburgh and West Lothian
Sites of Special Scientific Interest in Falkirk and Clackmannan
Sites of Special Scientific Interest in Mid and East Lothian
Sites of Special Scientific Interest in North East Fife
Bodies of water of the North Sea